Prince Michał Jerzy Poniatowski (12 October 1736 – 12 August 1794) was a Polish nobleman.

Abbot of Tyniec and Czerwińsk (opat tyniecki i czerwinski), Bishop of Płock and Coadjutor Bishop of Kraków (koadiutor krakowski) from 1773, and Archbishop of Gniezno and Primate of Poland from 1784.

He was made a knight of the Order of the White Eagle on 25 November 1764. Nine days later, on 4 December, he was made a prince by his brother, the last king of Poland, Stanisław August Poniatowski.

He was made a Royal Member of the Royal Society in 1791.

References 

 Angela Sołtys, Opat z San Michele. Grand Tour prymasa Poniatowskiego i jego kolekcje, Warszawa 2008
 Zofia Zielińska, Poniatowski Michał Jerzy, "Polski Słownik Biograficzny", XXVII, Wrocław 1983.

External links
 Virtual tour Gniezno Cathedral 
List of Primates of Poland 

Ecclesiastical senators of the Polish–Lithuanian Commonwealth
Archbishops of Gniezno
Bishops of Płock
18th-century Roman Catholic archbishops in the Polish–Lithuanian Commonwealth
Michal Jerzy
1736 births
1794 deaths
Abbots of Czerwińsk
Abbots of Tyniec
Recipients of the Order of the White Eagle (Poland)
Clergy from Gdańsk